Vitaliy Mikhailavich Zhuk (born 10 September 1996) is a Belarusian athlete competing in the combined events. He won a bronze medal in the decathlon at the 2018 European Championships.

International competitions

Personal bests
Outdoor
100 metres – 10.94 (+0.7 m/s, Götzis 2019)
400 metres – 47.81 (Talence 2019)
1500 metres – 4:30.36 (Götzis 2018)
110 metres hurdles – 14.48 (+1.7 m/s, Bydgoszcz 2017)
High jump – 2.00 (Grodno 2016)
Pole vault – 4.90 (Berlin 2018)
Long jump – 7.11 (+0.5 m/s, Götzis 2018)
Shot put – 15.66 (Lutsk 2019)
Discus throw – 48.64 (Lutsk 2019)
Javelin throw – 66.19 (Berlin 2018)
Decathlon – 8290 (Berlin 2018)

Indoor
60 metres – 7.13 (Glasgow 2019)
1000 metres – 2:46.94 (Gomel 2016)
60 metres hurdles – 8.20 (Mogilyov 2018)
High jump – 2.05 (Mogilyov 2019)
Pole vault – 4.80 (Glasgow 2019)
Long jump – 6.97 (Gomel 2018)
Shot put – 16.32 (Glasgow 2019)
Heptathlon – 5705 (Mogilyov 2019)

References

1996 births
Living people
Belarusian decathletes
Athletes (track and field) at the 2020 Summer Olympics
Olympic athletes of Belarus